Ryabushky (Ukrainian: Рябушки) is a railway station in Pivnichne, Sumy Oblast, Ukraine. It is on the Boromlya-Lebedynska line of the Sumy Directorate of Southern Railways.

Notes

 Tariff Guide No. 4. Book 1 (as of 05/15/2021) (Russian) Archived 05/15/2021.
 Arkhangelsky A.S., Arkhangelsky V.A. in two books. - M.: Transport, 1981. (rus.)

References

External Links

Ryabushky station on railwayz.info
Schedule for passenger trains
Schedule for suburban trains

Railway stations in Sumy Oblast
Sumy
Buildings and structures in Sumy Oblast
1895 establishments in Ukraine